Jimmy Morales (born James Ernesto Morales Cabrera, ; 18 March 1969) is a Guatemalan politician, actor and comedian. From 2016 to 2020, he served as the 50th president of Guatemala.

Early and personal life 
Morales was born in Guatemala City, to José Everardo Morales Orellana and Celita Ernestina Cabrera Acevedo. He comes from a circus family, and is an Evangelical Christian. His father was killed in a car accident when he was three years old, prompting him, his mother and three siblings to move to his grandparents' house, where he grew up.  By the time he was 10 years old, he and his brother Sammy accompanied their grandfather to sell bananas and used clothing at the market in Santa Lucia Milpas Altas.

He holds degrees in Business Administration from the national Universidad de San Carlos de Guatemala, and in Theology. Morales also holds a master's degree in Strategic Studies with specialization in Security and Defense from Mariano Gálvez University. He furthered his studies in Strategic Studies at Universidad de San Carlos de Guatemala.

Morales rose to fame as a TV comedian, starring in the series Moralejas ("Morals") alongside his brother Sammy. He formally changed his name from James Ernesto Morales Cabrera to Jimmy Morales by deed poll in 2011.

Morales has been married for three decades to Patricia Marroquín, and has three children.

Political career
In 2011, he ran as a mayoral candidate in Mixco in the Guatemala City suburbs for the small right-wing Action for National Development party. He placed third.

In 2013, Morales joined the small National Convergence Front (FCN/Nation) and became its Secretary-General.

Presidency

Presidential campaign
In 2015, Morales was nominated as the FCN's presidential candidate.  His priorities were fighting corruption, and dealing with chronic malnutrition, low education levels, and insecurity.  His slogan was "Neither corrupt, nor a thief" (Ni corrupto, ni ladrón). He ran on a platform of conservative values, and against corruption. He identifies as a nationalist, supports the death penalty, opposes abortion and legalized drugs, and denies that a genocide against the Ixil Maya took place.

He was initially considered an outsider but surprisingly led the field in the first round of the election, qualifying for a runoff alongside former First Lady Sandra Torres. Morales' success came after both former vice president Roxana Baldetti and outgoing president Otto Pérez Molina had to step down, and were arrested on fraud and corruption charges (the La Línea corruption case).

Administration

In the runoff, Morales defeated Torres in a landslide, taking 67.4 percent of the vote. Morales' success was viewed as a sign of the distrust of many Guatemalans towards the traditional political elite that ruled the country for decades. Voter anger and military support helped him win the presidency against more experienced politicians who voters felt were tainted by a corrupt political system.

On 24 December 2017, Morales announced that he planned to move the Guatemalan embassy in Israel from Tel Aviv to Jerusalem. He became the second national leader to announce a decision to make such a move, after the President of the United States, Donald Trump, made a similar announcement on 6 December.

On 18 June 2018, the Morales government was widely criticized for its slow action in favor of Guatemalans affected by the American policy of separating immigrant families; this caused the dismissal of the presidential spokesman Heinz Heimann who a day before his removal from the office said that the government respected the policy of President Trump.

Controversies

Arrest of relatives
In January 2017, Morales' older brother and close adviser Samuel "Sammy" Morales, as well as one of Morales' sons, José Manuel Morales, were arrested on corruption and money laundering charges. According to media reports, the arrests prompted several large protests of up to 15,000 people demanding for President Morales' removal. The most recent took place in September 2017. Morales refused to step down.

CICIG and illegal donations
In August 2017, Morales ordered the expulsion of Colombian Iván Velásquez, commissioner of the International Commission Against Impunity in Guatemala (CICIG), after it began "investigating claims that his party took illegal donations, including from drug-traffickers" and asked, "congress to strip him of immunity from prosecution." The Constitutional Court of Guatemala blocked the move. Minister of foreign affairs Carlos Raúl Morales had refused to sign the executive order and was removed from office along with vice-minister Carlos Ramiro Martínez, and vice-minister Anamaría Diéguez resigned. Velásquez confirmed he will continue as CICIG commissioner following the Constitutional Court decision to block his expulsion. In September 2017, the Congress of Guatemala refused to strip Morales of his immunity, rejecting commissioner Velásquez's suggestion.

Responsibility bonus
In September 2017, it was revealed that the Ministry of Defense, headed by Williams Mansilla, had been paying President Morales a $7,300 per month bonus since December 2016, in addition to his regular salary. The payments from the defense ministry were referred to as a "Bonus for Extraordinary Responsibility." Mansilla resigned from office soon after the payments were revealed to the public. He was later arrested and charged with corruption in January 2018, relating to the special bonus to Morales. President Morales denied the bonuses were illegal, but did return approximately $60,000 to the government.

Expenses
The acquisition by the government of services and luxury items for the president using public monies caused controversy, although he indicated not being personally involved in those expenses.

Sexual abuse accusations
A former cabinet minister accused Jimmy Morales of having sexually abused young female public workers with the complicity of other government officials.

Belize mobilization 
Guatemalan Defense Minister Williams Mansilla confirmed on 22 April 2016 that the deployment of 3,000 soldiers to the Guatemalan border with Belize, after a shooting incident on Belizean territory with army weapons resulted in the death of a 13-year-old boy and the wounding of his 11-year-old brother, as well as their 48-year-old father.

Calls for prosecution 
On 14 January 2020, Guatemalan civil society groups began pressuring Guatemalan authorities to arrest President Jimmy Morales for corruption after he left office. However, Morales would regain immunity from prosecution after it was agreed that other officials who served in his administration would be stripped of immunity from prosecution. Eight of his allies, including some who were not in his administration, were charged with corruption, including two former FCN legislators and 2019 FCN presidential candidate Estuardo Galdámez.

Honors
 Order of Brilliant Jade, Grand Cordon, awarded by the President of the Republic of China Tsai Ing-wen on January 11, 2017.
 Honorary doctorate, awarded by Hebrew University of Jerusalem, in November 2016.

See also
 Evangelical political parties in Latin America

References

External links 

 Personal website
 Presidential campaign website
 
 Biography by CIDOB (in Spanish)

 

1969 births
 Living people
 People from Guatemala City
 Guatemalan actor-politicians
 Guatemalan evangelicals
 Guatemalan male comedians
 Guatemalan male television actors
 Presidents of Guatemala
Universidad de San Carlos de Guatemala alumni
21st-century Guatemalan male actors